Đông Hưng is a district (huyện) of Thái Bình province in the Red River Delta region of Vietnam.

Đông Hung is the homeland of hát chèo, a traditional Vietnamese music genre, and water puppetry. The district is also well known for Cay cake.

As of 2003 the district had a population of 257,144. The district covers an area of 198 km². The district capital lies at Đông Hưng.

References

Districts of Thái Bình province